In algebraic topology, a discipline within mathematics, the acyclic models theorem can be used to show that two homology theories are isomorphic. The theorem was developed by topologists Samuel Eilenberg and Saunders MacLane.  They discovered that, when topologists were writing proofs to establish equivalence of various homology theories, there were numerous similarities in the processes.  Eilenberg and MacLane then discovered the theorem to generalize this process.

It can be used to prove the Eilenberg–Zilber theorem; this leads to the idea of the model category.

Statement of the theorem
Let  be an arbitrary category and  be the category of chain complexes of -modules over some ring . Let  be covariant functors such that:
  is - and -acyclic at these models, which means that  for all  and all .

Then the following assertions hold:
 Every natural transformation  induces a natural chain map .
 In particular the chain map  is unique up to natural chain homotopy.

Generalizations

Projective and acyclic complexes 

What is above is one of the earliest versions of the theorem.  Another
version is the one that says that if  is a complex of
complex in that category, then any map  extends to a chain map , unique up to
homotopy.

This specializes almost to the above theorem if one uses the functor category  as the abelian category. Free functors are projective objects in that category. The morphisms in the functor category are natural transformations, so the constructed chain maps and homotopies are all natural. The difference is that in the above version,  being acyclic is a stronger assumption than being acyclic only at certain objects.

On the other hand, the above version almost implies this version by letting  a category with only one object. Then the free functor  is basically just a free (and hence projective) module.  being acyclic at the models (there is only one) means nothing else than that the complex  is acyclic.

Acyclic classes 

There is a grand theorem that unifies both of the above.  Let  be an abelian category (for example,  or ). A class  of chain complexes over  will be called an acyclic class provided that:
 The complex  belongs to  if and only if the suspension of  does.

There are three natural examples of acyclic classes, although doubtless others exist. The first is that of homotopy contractible complexes. The second is that of acyclic complexes. In functor categories (e.g. the category of all functors from topological spaces to abelian groups), there is a class of complexes that are contractible on each object, but where the contractions might not be given by natural transformations. Another example is again in functor categories but this time the complexes are acyclic only at certain objects.

 (the identity functor on ). We say that the chain complex  is -presentable if for each , the chain complex

The boundary operator is given by
.
We say that the chain complex functor  is -acyclic if the augmented chain complex

Theorem. Let  be an acyclic class and  the corresponding class of arrows in the category of chain complexes. Then any natural transformation  extends, in the category  to a natural transformation of chain functors  and this is
unique in  up to chain homotopies. If we suppose, in addition, that  is -presentable, that  is -acyclic, and that  is an isomorphism, then  is homotopy equivalence.

Example 
Here is an example of this last theorem in action. Let
 be the singular chain complex functor and  be the simplicial chain complex functor. Let  be the functor that assigns to each space  the space
.
Here,  is the -simplex and this functor assigns to  the sum of as many copies of each -simplex as there are maps . The class  is the class of homology equivalences.

There are many other examples in both algebra and topology, some of which are described in

References

 Schon, R. "Acyclic models and excision." Proc. Amer. Math. Soc. 59(1) (1976) pp.167--168.

Homological algebra
Theorems in algebraic topology